The Brunei national under-19 football team is the under-19 football team of Brunei and is controlled by the Football Association of Brunei Darussalam.

Results and fixtures

2022 
2022 AFF U-19 Youth Championship

Coaching staff

Current squad
 The following players were called up for the 2022 AFF U-19 Youth Championship.
 Match dates: 2–15 July 2022
 Caps and goals correct as of:' 13 July 2022
 Names in italics denote players who have been capped for the senior team.''

See also 
 Brunei national football team
 Brunei national under-23 football team
 Brunei national under-21 football team
 Brunei national under-17 football team

References 

 u19